"Pink Frost" is a song by New Zealand band The Chills. The song was originally recorded in 1982. It was released as a single in 1984. Its B-side was the instrumental track "Purple Girl". It reached number 17 on the New Zealand singles chart.

The song was written by lead singer/guitarist Martin Phillipps, and features a line-up of Phillipps, Terry Moore (bass, backing vocals, percussion), and Martyn Bull (drums, percussion). The song was recorded on 29 May 1982 at The Lab Studios in Auckland and mixed in January 1984 at Auckland's Progressive Studios by Terry King, Doug Hood, Chris Knox, and band members Moore and Phillipps. It was released in June 1984. Owing to the length of time taken to release the track, it was a posthumous release for Bull, who had died of leukaemia during 1983. All of the proceeds made from the single's sales were donated to Cancer Research.

The song was initially released as a single only, but was later part of the 1986 compilation album Kaleidoscope World. It had previously been released in 1985 as a track on the Flying Nun compilation Tuatara (album). A video to accompany the single was filmed in and around Sandymount and Taiaroa Head on Otago Peninsula.

The song is often regarded as one of the key songs in the Dunedin sound style<ref>"Dunedin Music Video Special: Part 2 - The Chills 'Pink Frost'," dunedinusic.com, 30 April 2012. Retrieved 2 January 2018.</ref> and features a solid drum rhythm over which bass and a high guitar form complementary lead lines. Phillipps' vocals — telling a gothic tale of a lover accidentally killing his partner in his sleep — float above this rolling string pattern.

Covers
Los Angeles band Babyland recorded the song and released in on their 1994 album A Total Letdown Joel RL Phelps and the Downer Trio covered it on their album Tradition'' in 2004.

References

External links
 "Pink Frost" at AllMusic
 Musical analysis of 'Pink Frost' on AudioCulture

1984 singles
The Chills songs
Dunedin Sound songs
Songs about death
Murder ballads
Charity singles